The Bravio delle botti (Bravio of the barrels) is an annual race held in the Italian town of Montepulciano since 1974, replacing an equivalent horserace dating back to 1373. Teams of two runners (spingitori) representing the eight districts of the town (contrade) compete to be the first to roll an 80 kg wine barrel through the streets of the historic centre from the Colonna del Marzocco to the finish on the Piazza Grande, the cathedral square. The total distance is approximately 1800m and is uphill for nearly the entire course. As the streets are narrow and the barrels cumbersome to manoeuvre, collisions are frequent.

The word "bravio" derives from the Latin Bravium meaning "to be won". It refers to the prize given to the winning Contrada - a painted cloth bearing the image of the patron saint of the city.

The Contrade, and their colours, are:
 Cagnano: green and blue 
 Collazzi: yellow and green
 Le Coste: yellow and blue
 Gracciano: green and black 
 Poggiolo: white and blue
 San Donato: white and red
 Talosa: yellow and red
 Voltaia: red and black
Related festivities are held throughout the week of the Bravio including processions, religious blessing, practice runs, and parties hosted at each of the team headquarters.

Winners

 A second race was held in 1993 in support of the Italian Telethon

See also 
 Palio di Siena

References

External links 
 Official website: http://www.braviodellebotti.com/
 Discover Tuscany tourism: http://www.discovertuscany.com/montepulciano/bravio-delle-botti.html

Culture of Tuscany
Italian traditions
August events
Historical competitions of Italy
Montepulciano